Brian Wimmer (born October 1, 1959) is an American actor. He is probably best known for his role as Cpl. Boonie Lanier in the TV series China Beach, which ran from 1988 until 1991. He also regularly appeared on Flipper (1995-1996) and had roles in TV shows such as ER (1996) and The Fugitive (2001). He participated in the last Battle of the Network Stars (1988). He starred in the films Late for Dinner (1991), The Maddening (1995) and Beneath Loch Ness (2001).

Early life
Wimmer was born on October 1, 1959 in Orem, Utah to Larry, an economics professor at Brigham Young University, and Louise Wimmer.  He was raised in Provo, Utah. During high school, Wimmer began working as a ranch hand at Robert Redford's Sundance Resort, where he was ultimately employed for ten years.  He originally expected a career in the ski industry.

Career
In 1990, he played Alex in the television movie The World's Oldest Living Bridesmaid.

In 1991, he played Willie Husband in the film, Late for Dinner.

In 1993, he played a rapist the television film, Kiss of a Killer.

Wimmer has been the owner and operator of Fly Fishing Provo River, guiding and running fly fishing operations since 2004. In 2016 Brian helped to create the Sundance Fly Fishing program and Fly Shop at Sundance Mountain Resort, where he continues to operate. He has been fly fishing all over the world as a VIP guest angler and host to Fly Fishing America and Fly Fishing The World on ESPN.

Personal life
On December 31, 1996, Wimmer married Liza Utter.  As of June 15, 2000, they had separated.  He was later married to Susanne Sutchy, but they divorced in 2013.

Filmography

References

External links
 

1959 births
Living people
20th-century American male actors
American male film actors
American male television actors
Male actors from Utah